Yassine Abdellaoui (born 21 June 1975) is a Dutch former professional footballer who played as a midfielder.

Career
Born in Den Bosch, Abdellaoui played for OJC Rosmalen, Willem II, NAC Breda, Rayo, NEC and De Graafschap.

After retiring as a player in 2004, he worked as a coach, and in August 2016 was working with the Willem II youth team.

Personal life
Abdellaoui is of Moroccan descent.

In 2003, he was arrested on accusation of tax fraud. In 2015, he was acquitted of money laundering charges. In 2019, he was shot and wounded in Amsterdam.

References

1975 births
Living people
Sportspeople from 's-Hertogenbosch
Footballers from North Brabant
Dutch sportspeople of Moroccan descent
Dutch footballers
Association football midfielders
OJC Rosmalen players
Willem II (football club) players
NAC Breda players
Rayo Vallecano players
NEC Nijmegen players
De Graafschap players
Eredivisie players
La Liga players
Segunda División players
Eerste Divisie players
Dutch expatriate footballers
Dutch expatriate sportspeople in Spain
Expatriate footballers in Spain